Brian Smith (born 9 September 1966) is an Australian rugby union coach and former rugby union and rugby league footballer who played in the 1980s and 1990s. He played for both Australia and Ireland in rugby union.

Smith was born in St George, Queensland. He played rugby union for Queensland, and won six caps for Australia in 1987. He played in two Varsity matches for Oxford University as well as captaining them. He played for Wests Bulldogs. He also played nine times for Ireland between 1989 and 1991 as a fly-half. For the 1990/91 season he played club rugby for Leicester Tigers in England.

He later played rugby league for the Balmain Tigers (1991 to 1993) and Eastern Suburbs (1994) in the NSWRL competition. In 1992, he played City Origin. Smith played for the Maroons in 1992 and 93.

He has coached rugby union at the Ricoh Rugby Club in Japan, Eastern Suburbs in Sydney, Bath Rugby, the youth setup in New South Wales, and was coaching co-ordinator at the ACT Brumbies. He has coached at representative level with the Australia Sevens side. While Director of Rugby at London Irish in the Guinness Premiership, Smith was linked with the Ireland job as a replacement for Eddie O'Sullivan. In July 2008 he was appointed England attack coach.

References

External links
London Irish profile (archived)
Scrum.com profile
Rugby League Project stats
Sportingheroes profile
The life of Brian : International Rugby News (archived)

1966 births
Living people
Australian rugby union coaches
Australian rugby union players
Australia international rugby union players
Australian rugby league players
Balmain Tigers players
Australian people of Irish descent
New South Wales City Origin rugby league team players
Irish rugby union players
British people of Irish descent
Rugby union fly-halves
Rugby union scrum-halves
Sydney Roosters players
Oxford University RFC players
People educated at Brisbane State High School
Ireland international rugby union players
Leicester Tigers players
Rugby league players from Queensland
Rugby union players from Queensland